Ottaviano Garzadori (or Garzadoro; ca. 1570-1653) was a Roman Catholic prelate who served as Archbishop of Zadar (1624–1639) and Bishop of Boiano (1622–1624).

Biography
Ottaviano Garzadori was born in 1567 in Vicenza, Italy.

On 17 March 1614, he was appointed during the papacy of Pope Paul V as Bishop of Ossero. On 31 March 1614, he was consecrated bishop by Giovanni Garzia Mellini, Cardinal-Priest of Santi Quattro Coronati, with Coriolani Garzadoro, Bishop Emeritus of Ossero, and Marco Cornaro (bishop), Bishop of Padua, serving as co-consecrators. He served as Bishop of Ossero until 1620.<

On 19 December 1622, he was appointed by Pope Gregory XV as Bishop of Boiano.

On 22 January 1623, he was consecrated bishop by Marco Antonio Gozzadini, Cardinal-Priest of Sant’Eusebio with Alessandro Bosco, Bishop of Gerace, and Carlo Bovi, Bishop of Bagnoregio serving as co-consecrators. On 11 March 1624, he was appointed by Pope Urban VIII as Archbishop of Zadar. He served as Archbishop of Zadar until his resignation in January 1639.

References

External links and additional sources
 (for Chronology of Bishops) 
 (for Chronology of Bishops) 
 (for Chronology of Bishops) 
 (for Chronology of Bishops) 

1567 births
1653 deaths
17th-century Roman Catholic bishops in Croatia
17th-century Roman Catholic archbishops in the Republic of Venice
Bishops appointed by Pope Paul V
Bishops appointed by Pope Gregory XV
Bishops appointed by Pope Urban VIII